Iakovos Kambanellis (Greek: Ιάκωβος Καμπανέλλης; 2 December 1921 – 29 March 2011) was a Greek poet, playwright, screenwriter, lyricist, and novelist.

Biography
Born 2 December 1921 in Hora on the island of Naxos, the sixth of nine children of Stefanos Kampanellis, an experienced pharmacist, and Aikaterini Laskari. His father came from Chios, while his mother came from an old noble family in Istanbul. Iakovos Kambanellis appeared as one of the most prominent Greek playwrights of the 20th century and he is considered to be the father of modern Greek theater. As a survivor of the Mauthausen-Gusen concentration camp, he wrote the lyrics of the "Mauthausen Trilogy" with music by Mikis Theodorakis. He has also written a memoir known as Mauthausen describing his experiences from the concentration camp. He wrote the scripts of at least 12 films and he directed three of them. In addition, he is well known as a lyricist, having written the lyrics for more than 100 songs. He was a member of the board of the Cultural Foundation of the National Bank of Greece (MIET – Morfotiko Idryma Ethnikis Trapezis), along with some of the most prominent Greek artists. From 1981-87, he was Director of the Radio section of the Greek National Broadcasting Company (E.R.T.). In 2000 he was elected member of the Academy of Athens. The same year he was awarded the medal of the Order of Phoenix by the President of the Greek Republic.

Death
Kambanellis was rushed to the hospital on 4 February 2011 due to complications of his long-term kidney failure.
At the age of 89, he died on 29 March 2011 from kidney failure, nine days after his wife's death.

Theatre

Cinema
He wrote several scripts for films including:
Stella directed by Michael Cacoyiannis
O Drakos (The Ogre of Athens) directed by Nikos Koundouros
Arpagi tis Persefonis (The Siege of Persephone) directed by Grigoris Grigoriou
To kanoni kai t'aïdoni (The Cannon and the Nightingale) directed by himself and Giorgos Kampanellis

Many of his plays are translated in several languages and produced in countries all over the world: in Austria, Bulgaria, Iran, England, Germany, Hungary, Romania, U.S.A., Russia, China, Norway and Sweden. His plays translated in Iran by Reza Shirmarz, famous playwright, translator, author and researcher, have been republished several times in a short time. He worked as a journalist in newspapers Eleftheria (1963–65), Anendotos (1965–66) and Nea (1975-1980). He has been a member of the Greek Theatre Writers' Company.

References

External links
 World Greek Reporter: Plays of Iakovos Kambanellis Reach Iran
 Official website for the life and work of Iakovos Kambanellis
 
  Iakovos Kambanellis' play called Ibsenland
I. Kambanellis biography Frankfurt Book Exposition 2001 – Greece, an honoured country 

1921 births
People from Naxos
Greek artists
Greek screenwriters
Greek film directors
Deaths from kidney failure
Greek lyricists
Theatre in Greece
Mauthausen concentration camp survivors
2011 deaths
Members of the Academy of Athens (modern)
Grand Commanders of the Order of the Phoenix (Greece)
20th-century Greek novelists
20th-century Greek dramatists and playwrights
20th-century Greek poets